The following highways are numbered 75:

International
 Asian Highway 75
 European route E75

Afghanistan
Kandahar-Boldak Highway (A75)

Australia
 Cobb Highway, NSW
 Northern Highway, Victoria

Brazil
 SP-75

Canada
 Manitoba Highway 75
 Newfoundland and Labrador Route 75

China
  G75 Lanzhou–Haikou Expressway

France
A75 autoroute

India
  National Highway 75 (India)

Israel
 Highway 75 (Israel)

Korea, South
 National Route 75

New Zealand
 New Zealand State Highway 75

Philippines
 N75 highway (Philippines)

United Kingdom
 A75 road in Scotland

United States
 Interstate 75
 Interstate 75E (former proposal)
 U.S. Route 75
 Alabama State Route 75
 Arizona State Route 75
 Arkansas Highway 75
 California State Route 75
 Colorado State Highway 75
 Connecticut Route 75
 Florida State Road 75
 Georgia State Route 75
 Idaho State Highway 75
 Illinois Route 75
 Indiana State Road 75
 Kentucky Route 75 (former)
 Louisiana Highway 75
 Maryland Route 75
Maryland Route 75A
Maryland Route 75FB (former)
Maryland Route 75FC (former)
 Massachusetts Route 75
 M-75 (Michigan highway)
Minnesota State Highway 75 (1920-1933) (former)
 County Road 75 (Ramsey County, Minnesota)
 County Road 75 (Stearns County, Minnesota)
 County Road 75 (Wright County, Minnesota)
 Missouri Route 75
 Nebraska Highway 75 (former)
 Nevada State Route 75 (former)
 New Hampshire Route 75
 New Jersey Route 75 (former proposal)
 County Route 75 (Bergen County, New Jersey)
 New Mexico State Road 75
 New York State Route 75
 County Route 75 (Cattaraugus County, New York)
 County Route 75 (Chautauqua County, New York)
 County Route 75 (Dutchess County, New York)
 County Route 75 (Erie County, New York)
 County Route 75 (Essex County, New York)
 County Route 75 (Greene County, New York)
 County Route 75 (Herkimer County, New York)
 County Route 75 (Jefferson County, New York)
 County Route 75 (Madison County, New York)
 County Route 75 (Rockland County, New York)
 County Route 75 (Saratoga County, New York)
 County Route 75 (Suffolk County, New York)
 County Route 75 (Washington County, New York)
 North Carolina Highway 75
 Ohio State Route 75 (1923) (former)
 Pennsylvania Route 75
 South Carolina Highway 75
 South Dakota Highway 75
 Tennessee State Route 75
 Texas State Highway 75
 Texas State Highway Loop 75
 Farm to Market Road 75
 Utah State Route 75
 Virginia State Route 75
 West Virginia Route 75
 Wisconsin Highway 75
 Wyoming Highway 75 (former)

Territories
 U.S. Virgin Islands Highway 75

See also
A75 (disambiguation)